At least two ships of the French Navy have been named Marocain:

 , an  launched in 1917 and struck in 1935.
 , a  launched as USS Marocain in 1944 and transferred to France. She was returned to the US Navy in 1964.

French Navy ship names